The Emblem of Chandigarh is the official seal of the government of the Indian union territory of Chandigarh.

Design
The emblem consists of a circular shield depicting a representation of Le Corbusier's Open Hand Monument sculpture which is widely regarded as a symbol of the city of Chandigarh.

Government banner
The administration of Chandigarh can be represented by a banner depicting the emblem of the territory on a white background.

See also
 National Emblem of India
 List of Indian state emblems

References

Chandigarh